Henry Einspruch (born  Khaim-Yekhiel Aynshprukh in Tarnów, Galicia, 27 December 1892 – 4 January 1977), was a Galician-born Jew who converted to Lutheranism, becoming a Messianic missionary affiliated with the Hebrew Christian movement. Einspruch translated Christian literature into Yiddish, Hebrew, Polish, Russian, and English. His most notable work was a translation of the Christian New Testament into Yiddish.

Early life
His father Mendel was a scholar, an iron merchant, and a Santser Hassid. His mother Mirl was the daughter of the cantor of the main synagogue in the city of Jarosław. As a teenager, Einspruch was drawn to Christianity. Raised in a Yiddish-speaking home, he was a yeshiva student who studied under the rabbi of Barnov. Einspruch attended a Baron Hirsch School and the Tarnów High School. Along with other Jewish socialists, Einspruch was active in the Poale Zion movement and helped organize a strike of clerks, tailors, and teachers at religious elementary schools. He began his literary career in 1908-1909, working as the Tarnów correspondent for Poale Zion's magazine Der Yidisher Arbeyter (The Jewish Worker). In 1909, at the age of 17, he made aliyah to Ottoman Palestine and worked at Merhavia, a moshav in Galilee. In 1911, he immigrated to the Khedivate of Egypt. After living in Egypt, he returned to Poland and converted to Christianity under the guidance of the Jewish-born Messianic missionary Khayem (Lucky) Yedidiah Pollak. By 1913, he had immigrated to the United States and lived in Cleveland and New York City, working at a restaurant and an iron factory. Moving to Chicago, he studied at Moody Bible Institute and graduated in 1916;  he also studied at McCormick Theological Seminary. He moved to Baltimore in 1920 and studied at Johns Hopkins University.

Career as Christian missionary
in 1923, Einspruch founded the Salem Hebrew Lutheran Mission in East Baltimore, located at the intersection of South Caroline and East Baltimore streets in Baltimore's historic Jewish quarter close to Corned Beef Row. The Salem Hebrew Lutheran Mission's church building has a Magen David above its entrance with the Greek letters iota eta sigma (IHS, a monogram for "Jesus Christ"). Einspruch founded Lederer Messianic Jewish Communications, which became the largest publisher of "Hebrew-Christian" literature in the world. On Shabbat, Einspruch was known to regularly stand on a soapbox in front of various Baltimore-area synagogues and deliver Christian sermons in the Yiddish language.

Later life and death
Einspruch died in January 1977 in Washington, D.C. He was survived by his wife Marie (April 3, 1909 – March 17, 2012), whom he married in 1941. Marie Einspruch was a Christian missionary from Bethlehem, Pennsylvania who was of Pennsylvania Dutch heritage and thus could easily understand Yiddish due to the high level of mutual intelligibility of Yiddish and the Pennsylvania Dutch language. As a Lutheran deaconess, she joined the Jewish Mission in Baltimore in 1931, and was the official typesetter for her husband's Yiddish translation of the Christian New Testament. Following Henry Einspruch's death in 1977, Marie became the director of what had become known as the Lederer/Messianic Jewish Resources International. Marie Einspruch died in Rockville, Maryland in 2012 at the age of 102. Henry and Marie Einspruch are survived by their daughter Muriel.

References

Bibliography
Einspruch, Henry. 600,000,000 People Can't Be Wrong: A Modern Jew Looks at Jesus, Chicago: Good News Publishers, [date of publication not identified]
Einspruch, Henry. Der Brīf fūn Yaʻqov ha-shaliyaḥ, Baltimore: The Mediator, [1933?]
Einspruch, Henry. Der Bris Hadoshe, Balṭimor: Laybush un Ḥayah Lederer Fond, 1959.
Einspruch, Henry; Geden, A. S.; Kilgour, R.; American Bible Society. Dīʼ gūṭeʻ Beśūrah lōyṭ Matyaʼ : ʼa nayyeʻ ʼībeʻrzeʻṣūng., New York : American Bible Society, 1925.
Einspruch, Henry. Jewish Confessors of the Faith, Brooklyn, N.Y.: Amsterdam Bd. of Missions to the Jews, 1925.
Einspruch, Henry. Lider fun gloybn Hymns of faith, rendered into Yiddish, 	Baltimore, Mediator, 1935.
Einspruch, Henry. When Jews face Christ, Brooklyn: American Board of Missions to the Jews, 1939.

External links

1892 births
1977 deaths
20th-century American Lutheran clergy
American people of Polish-Jewish descent
Ashkenazi Jews in Ottoman Palestine
Austro-Hungarian Jews
Austro-Hungarian emigrants to the Ottoman Empire
Austro-Hungarian emigrants to the United States
Converts to Lutheranism from Judaism
Egyptian Ashkenazi Jews
Egyptian people of Polish-Jewish descent
Egyptian Protestants
Hebrew Christian movement
Hebrew-language writers
Jews from Galicia (Eastern Europe)
Johns Hopkins University alumni
Labor Zionists
McCormick Theological Seminary alumni
Messianic clergy
Moshavniks
People from Cleveland
People from the Kingdom of Galicia and Lodomeria
Clergy from New York City
People from Tarnów
People from Washington, D.C.
Polish Lutherans
Polish emigrants to the Ottoman Empire
Polish emigrants to the United States
Polish-language writers
Polish Orthodox Jews
Polish Zionists
Religious leaders from Baltimore
Russian-language writers
Sanz (Hasidic dynasty)
Translators of the Bible into Yiddish
Yiddish culture in Maryland
Yiddish–English translators
Yiddish-language writers
Writers from Baltimore
Jewish translators of the Bible